Utter Inn (Swedish) or in English, Otter Inn, is an art project by Mikael Genberg that offers underwater accommodation to the public. The facility is entered through a small, typical-appearing Swedish house on the surface of the water. The only representation of this concept is, at this point, in Lake Mälaren near the town of Västerås in Sweden.

See also
 Poseidon Undersea Resorts
 Jules' Undersea Lodge
 Underwater habitat

References

External links 
 www.mikaelgenberg.com - personal site of the artist, with pictures of Utter Inn

Underwater habitats
Mälaren
Hotels in Sweden